Karon may refer to:
 Karon (name) (includes a list of people with the name)
 Karon language, a language of Senegal and Gambia
 Karon Pantai language, or Abun, a language spoken on the north coast of West Papua
 Karon Dori language, a language of West Papua, spoken further inland from Karon Pantai and generally considered a dialect of Maybrat
 Karon Beach, a beach and town in Phuket, Thailand
 Karon, Deoghar, a community development block in Jharkhand, India
 Karon, Deoghar (village), a village in Jharkhand, India

See also 
 Caron (disambiguation)